Thylactus pulawskii is a species of beetle in the family Cerambycidae. It was described by Hua in 1986.

References

Xylorhizini
Beetles described in 1986